Michael Brun (born 19 May 1992) is a Haitian DJ and record producer based in New York, known for blending electronic music with traditional Haitian styles such as kompa and rara. He released his debut EP Gravity in 2013 and founded the record label Kid Coconut in 2014, to showcase Haitian music and develop Haitian artists. In 2018, he released the single "Positivo" with J Balvin, which became the theme song for the 2018 FIFA World Cup. His debut album, Lokal, was released on June 26, 2019.

Early life and education
Brun was born and raised in Port-au-Prince, Haiti, to a Guyanese mother and Haitian father. He also has French Haitian, Portuguese, Chinese Haitian, and Afro-Haitian ancestry. Growing up he was exposed to the music of Caribbean Sextet and Tabou Combo, which influenced his musical tastes. His father was in a band called Skandal in the '90s. Brun began playing piano, violin and guitar at a young age.

He initially intended to have a career as a pediatrician. At 15, he began DJing and producing his own electronic music tracks as a hobby. He attended Culver Military Academy in Indiana and then Davidson College in North Carolina as a pre-med student, while continuing to work on his music production.

Music career

2011: First singles and Gravity EP
Brun was one of the first electronic music artists in Haiti. On June 29, 2011, he released the 4-track single Shades of Grey on S2 Records. Primarily styled as progressive house, Brun released "Dawn," on Dutch DJ Hardwell's Revealed Recordings on December 21, 2011. Dirty South signed Brun to his label Phazing Records shortly after, releasing Brun's next single "Rise". Brun also joined Dirty South on tour in Miami. Around that time, he started performing at major events including Coachella and Electric Daisy Carnival, and decided to take a hiatus from medical school.

In 2012, Brun released the tracks "Rift" with Dirty South and "Synergy" with Special Features. Brun released his debut EP Gravity in September 2013, which reached number 2 on the Beatport charts. Also in 2013 he remixed tracks for artists such as Alicia Keys, Calvin Harris and Armin van Buuren.

2014-15: Touring, singles, and Kid Coconut imprint
In March 2014, Brun became the first Haitian to play at Ultra Music Festival. That year he also performed at the Moonrise Festival in Baltimore, and at Coachella. He was nominated for World's Best EDM Artist at the World Music Awards.

In August 2014 Brun released the single "Zenith," which was the first release on his new label Kid Coconut. In June 2015, he released "See You Soon" on Kid Coconut. He then released a collaboration with Roy English titled "Tongue Tied July".

In 2015 he performed at clubs including Create (Los Angeles), Temple (San Francisco), Union Nightclub (Toronto), and Story (Miami), and also appeared at the Billboard Hot 100 Festival.

2016-17: "Wherever I Go” single, tour and festival

In January 2016, Brun released "Wherever I Go", a collaboration with Artists for Peace and Justice's Audio Institute. He then embarked on his first North American Tour, titled the Wherever I Go Tour, followed by the creation of the Wherever I Go Festival in Port-au-Prince, Haiti.

In May 2016, he collaborated with American artist The Ready Set and released a remix to The Ready Set's song Good Enough which charted at number 40 on US Billboard Dance/Mix Show Airplay.

In August 2016, he released a collaboration with Louie for the Netflix film XOXO, titled "All I Ever Wanted". In October 2016, he announced Haitian Heat, a Haitian music playlist that he curates for Spotify.

In January 2017, he released "Gaya", a collaboration with Haitian roots music collective Lakou Mizik and Haitian pop artist J. Perry. He followed "Gaya" with remixes for OneRepublic, Maxwell, Kesha, Major Lazer and FLETCHER. He released "Easy On My Love" in December 2017.

2018-present: “Positivo” and Lokal
In 2018, as part of collaborations with artists from around the world to bring Haitian sounds into the mainstream, he released the single "Positivo" with Latin singer J Balvin. It was the theme song for Telemundo's 2018 FIFA World Cup coverage, and as of March 2019, has over 12 million views on YouTube. Brun also opened for J Balvin on his 2018 Vibras tour.

In 2017, Brun began experimenting with songs that would bridge the gap between Nigerian afrobeat and Haitian music. This led to the concept behind his debut album Lokal, released on Kid Coconut on June 26, 2019. The album's first single was "Akwaaba Ayiti", a reworking of a song by Mr Eazi. The nine-track album features collaborations with artists including Major Lazer, Win Butler and Regine Chassagne of Arcade Fire, J. Perry, Eddy François, and BélO.   The track "Nouvo Jenerasyon" includes a sample of a song from his father's konpa band Skandal.

Brun puts on an annual Haitian block party-style tour called Bayo, with the third edition taking place in 10 North American cities in 2019. Special guests on the tour included Maxwell, Boukman Eksperyans, and Adekunle Gold. It started out in 2016 as a free block party in Haiti. He also played a set at Coachella 2019.

Personal life
Brun lives in Brooklyn, New York. He is an ambassador for Paul Haggis' Artists for Peace and Justice, a nonprofit that encourages peace and social justice. He mentors children in Haiti's nonprofit school The Audio Institute, and is also on the board.

Awards and nominations

Discography

Albums

Extended plays

Singles

Remixes

Radio appearances

References

External links
 Official website

1992 births
Living people
People from Port-au-Prince
21st-century Haitian musicians
Haitian DJs
Haitian record producers
Remixers
Haitian people of Chinese descent
Davidson College alumni
Culver Academies alumni
Electronic dance music DJs
Progressive house musicians
Latin Grammy Award winners